Kostas Davourlis Stadium is a stadium in Patras, Greece. It is the home of Panachaiki FC. Work on the grounds started in 1935. Originally called Stadium of Panachaiki, it has been officially renamed Kostas Davourlis in 1992 after the great football player who died the same year.

History
It was inaugurated on June 6, 1939. Kostas Davourlis Stadium originally had one stand (south). It acquired its present horseshoe-like shape in 1974. The stadium is in a much better condition today than a few years ago. The placement of plastic seats and the construction of the roof (north stand) in 1997; the refurbishment of facilities below the stands (VIP club, cafeteria, club shop) and the installation of floodlights in 2000 have done much to upgrade it.

The capacity of the stadium has changed frequently, peaking at 22,000 after a 1974 expansion. Since then there have been a number of reductions due to modernisations. Record attendance is 21.350 in a football match between Olympiacos Piraeus FC and Panathinaikos FC in 1982.

Adjacent the Kostas Davourlis Stadium is Panachaiki's arena for indoor sports, built in 1984.

Potential improvements
The stadium can become much better, as there are still many problems. Access to the stadium and the lack of parking spaces are probably the most important of these. There is talk that a large car park will be constructed on the western side of the stadium, but this will only go through if the necessary funds are secured.

Notable matches 
1939: Panachaiki 3 - Asteras Patras 1, friendly match
1974: Panachaiki 1 - FC Twente 1, UEFA Cup 1973–74
1976: Greece 0 - Israel - 1, friendly match

Gallery

References

Notes 

PANACHAIKI F.C. Official website 

Football venues in Greece
Sports venues in Patras
Panachaiki G.E.